Route 910 is a  long north to south secondary highway in the southern portion of New Brunswick, Canada.

Route description
Most of the route is in Albert County.

The route's northern terminus is between Coverdale and Middle Coverdale at Route 112. It travels southwest through a mostly treed area where it begins following the Turtle Creek passing through Lower Turtle Creek.  The route continues south crossing the Turtle Creek Reservoir then continuing through Turtle Creek, then Berryton and Rosevale.  Here the route makes a sharp turn northwest passing Caledonia Mountain, Baltimore and Osborne Corner.  As the route continues, it passes through Beech Hill, Shenstone, and Isaiah Corner.  The route then crosses Weldon Creek into Salem where it is now known as the Salem Rd and ends in Hillsborough at Route 114 near Greys Island Cemetery.

History

See also

References

905
905